is a Japanese football player. He plays for Honda Lock.

Club statistics

References

External links

1987 births
Living people
Association football people from Kumamoto Prefecture
Japanese footballers
J1 League players
J2 League players
Japan Football League players
Oita Trinita players
Sagan Tosu players
Renofa Yamaguchi FC players
Kamatamare Sanuki players
Honda Lock SC players
Association football defenders